Darrin Kenneth O'Brien (born October 30, 1969), known by his stage name Snow, is a Canadian reggae musician, rapper and singer. His 1992 single "Informer" spent seven weeks at No. 1 on the US Billboard Hot 100.

Early life
Snow was born and raised in the North York district of Toronto, one of four children born to an Irish-Canadian cabdriver and a homemaker. Following his parents' divorce, he was raised by his mother in the Allenbury Gardens public housing project where, he says, he was fascinated with the gangster lifestyle, fell in with a tough Irish-Canadian group and became involved in a cycle of fighting, drinking and stealing. He never learned to read properly and dropped out of school while in the 9th grade. As he was growing up, he had a strong interest in rock music but, in 1983, there was an influx of Jamaican immigrants to the neighborhood, his interest turned to reggae music and he became adept at the use of the Jamaican dialect, or Jamaican Patois. He developed his own style of music, by blending dancehall and reggae with rock and pop music.

In 1987, Snow served eight months of a one-year sentence after pleading guilty to beating a person with a crowbar during a bar brawl. Upon his release in January 1988, the Jamaican-born DJ Marvin Prince saw O'Brien deejaying at a party and the two became friends. For the next few years, they practiced in Prince's basement, and played parties, with Snow providing vocals and Prince playing records. Prince, who would claim that he helped Snow refine his reggae singing and use of the Jamaican dialect, and that he came up with the name 'Snow', told the Los Angeles Times that they passed around a lot of tapes but could not get Snow signed because he was white. 

In 1988, Snow was involved in an incident at a North York pub, in which two people were stabbed. Other people in the group pointed the finger at him, and he was charged with two counts of attempted murder.  Rather than tell authorities who the perpetrator was, Snow served eight months in jail before a jury acquitted him on both counts. While he was in jail, he went to school and wrote music, which he performed for fellow inmates. One song was called "Informer".

Career
On a trip to New York, Prince was able to pitch Snow's music to rap star M.C. Shan. In 1991, Snow went to New York, where Shan introduced him to music producers David Eng and Steve Salem. Snow signed a contract to record on their Motorjam/Elektra record label, then they recorded his debut album 12 Inches of Snow. The album had to be recorded quickly, because Snow had to return to Canada and report to prison.

12 Inches of Snow was released in 1992, while Snow was in prison. Shan, Eng, Salem, and  Prince promoted it and, by the time Snow was released, the single "Informer", was a chart-topping hit. 12 Inches of Snow sold over 8 million copies worldwide, with the "Informer" single remaining number 1 on the American Billboard charts for seven consecutive weeks. "Informer" has been recorded twice in the Guinness Book of World Records as the best-selling reggae single in US history, as well as the highest charting reggae single in history. A second single, "Girl I've Been Hurt", reached Number 19 on the Hot 100. In Japan, Snow received the Recording Industry Association of Japan's 1994 Japan Gold Disc Award for New Artist of the Year.

Origin of stage name 
One of Snow's neighbouring Jamaican families, the Browns, first introduced him to reggae, Snow began borrowing and ordering reggae dub tapes to perform over. After he befriended Marvin Prince, Prince gave O'Brien the stage name Snow with a phrased backronym meaning "Super Notorious Outrageous Whiteboy". Snow never claimed the title himself and simply continued to perform with the stage name of Snow. The origin of Snow's stage name would become a central issue in the legal battle between Prince and O'Brien.

Legal disputes over production of 12 Inches of Snow 
While touring as Snow's DJ in December 1994, Marvin Prince abruptly left the tour after discovering that Snow, according to court documents, "was receiving more money from management than he was."  While listed as only the writer of the song "Runway" on the 12 Inches of Snow album, Prince claimed to have co-written five songs and co-produced the album with Shan, Eng, and Salem.  Prince alleged that Eng and Salem provided "a draft of a multi-album production and recording agreement" to both Snow and himself.  Unable to understand the contract, Snow allegedly "sent a copy to his mother to get legal advice from her friend" and Prince "never saw the agreement again."  Moreover, Prince claimed to have entered an "oral agreement" with Snow implying that the two would share profits from the album "fifty-fifty".  The first agreement, Prince alleged, occurred "in 1990, when the two men began working together on songs in Prince's basement and he "allegedly suggested to" Snow, "if something comes out of this, let's be partners." The second oral agreement, according to Prince, took place in August 1991 while Snow auditioned for Shan.  Snow referred to Prince as his partner in a promotional video, but claimed to have used the term "only in the slang sense." Prince "admitted that these discussions were not concrete; the parties never organized a formal business plan, nor was plaintiff in New York to advance defendant's career."

Shan, Eng, and Salem testified that they were unaware of a partnership between Snow and Prince, and Shan denied that Prince co-produced 12 Inches of Snow and co-wrote the five songs in question. "Informer", for example, was officially written by Snow, Shan, and composer Edmond Leary. Years later, after Snow and Prince had their falling out, Prince unsuccessfully sued Snow for compensation. While Prince had initially been awarded a $1.5 million settlement by a jury, the court overturned the original ruling and dismissed Prince's suit on the grounds that he had "no viable claims" to a partnership with Snow.

In a 2019 interview, Prince recounted his history with Snow and described how he mentored, recorded demos for, scheduled showcase performances for, and ultimately, arranged for Snow to audition for MC Shan. Prince recounted how he and Snow wrote "Informer" over the phone while Snow was serving his sentence at Maplehurst Correctional Complex. Prince recalled playing Junior Reid’s "Foreign Mind" over the phone, and Snow used the track's flute melody as the basis for "Informer". Parts of the first verse and third verse of "Informer", according to Prince, were reworked from Eek-A-Mouse’s performance of "Tell Them" at Sunsplash 1981. Originally, Prince alleges, the final verse of "Informer" was written and performed by a second vocalist named “Little Red.” Prince maintains that the judge who overturned the original ruling did so illegally, and he believes race played a role in the judge’s decision.

Co-producer and co-writer Edmond Leary later claimed M.C. Shan unfairly received most of the production credits for 12 Inches of Snow.  He told Vice, "So actually, if you want the truth of the matter, if we hadn’t done it equally and had to split up the money I would have gotten 70% of writer’s [royalties] off that album they probably would have split up 30, because I wrote most of that album. Most of the words were mine, and the ideas and structures and backgrounds in the vocal booth with me telling him what keys to sing the harmonies in and what have you. So I had a lot to do with that sound that became so popular and went Platinum." After struggling with a cocaine addiction and homelessness, in 2013 Leary was a street performer at Madison Square Park and Union Square.

International success 
In 1994, Snow collaborated with Cyndi Lauper on Junior Vasquez's Homegrown and Sly and Robbie's Pop Goes the Dancehall remix of "Girls Just Want to Have Fun", retitled "Hey Now (Girls Just Want to Have Fun)". 

Eng had a studio in Jamaica and, in 1994, Snow recorded his second album Murder Love in Jamaica, Canada, and New York. While not a commercial success in North America, the album featured Snow performing with reggae and dancehall musicians Ninjaman, Junior Reid, Half Pint, Buju Banton, Beenie Man, Dave Kelly, and Sly and Robbie. The "Anything for You" remix became a club favorite and, according to Billboard'''s Elena Oumano, made Snow a figure of respect on the Jamaican music scene.For an example of the continued popularity of "Anything For You," see Andre Jeb Binson, "Mellow Vibes, Music and Crowd," Kingston Gleaner News (The Gleaner), May 2, 2006. "Anything For You" became the top-selling single in Jamaica in 1995 and "Si Wi Dem Nuh Know We" also reached the number one slot in Jamaica.Jamaican charting data for "Si Wi Dem Nuh Know We" can be found in Pace (Johannesburg: Pace-Maker, 1995), 41. Murder Love proved to be a popular album in Asia, with the single "Sexy Girl" remaining on Japan's Top Singles chart for 16 weeks, ultimately reaching number one.For an online source see Super B.P.M Charts Tokyo at: http://www.sound.jp/tnsn/az/tokio-bpm_f.html  

The success of Murder Love allowed Snow to tour Asia and collaborate with Thai rap artist Joey Boy. In 1996, Eng established an office in Bangkok, founded Dimsum Entertainment, and included Snow in this expansion. In 1996, Eng produced Joey Boy's album Fun, Fun, Fun. Snow performed on the chart-topping Thai single "Fun, Fun, Fun" and appeared in the music video.  Joey Boy appeared on Snow's Thai single "Me and Joey".  In 2008, Snow also featured Joey Boy on the track "Catch a Kick".

By the end of 1996, Murder Loves "Si We Dem Nuh Know We" received a Juno nomination for Best Reggae Recording. Overall, the album produced three music videos: "Anything For You", "Anything For You (All Star Cast Remix)", and "Sexy Girl". In the 1995 film Klash, Snow appears performing "Rivertown".

Snow followed up Murder Love with an album named after his daughter, Justuss. The first single "Boom Boom Boogie" took Asia by storm, achieving gold status with the music video appearing on MTV Japan five to six times a day. Released in the United States and Canada in 1997, the single "If This World Were Mine" failed to chart but the video regularly appeared on The Box. The album reached number 12 on the U.S. reggae charts and in 1998 was nominated for Best Reggae album at the Juno Awards in Vancouver, British Columbia. In late 1997, Snow released a "Greatest Hits" compilation, called The Greatest Hits of Snow.For "If This World Were Mine" on The Box, see: "Video Monitor", Billboard, May 17, 1997, 73.

In 1999, Snow reunited with M.C. Shan, producing the album Cooler Conditions in Japan. The only single, "The Plumb Song", spent eight weeks on the Japan Singles chart, peaking at number 27. It was recorded at Metalworks Studios in Mississauga, Ontario.

 Return to the Canadian charts 
In 2000, Snow signed to Virgin Music Canada. Later that year, he released the album Mind on the Moon. The single "Everybody Wants to Be Like You" landed Snow back on the Canadian Singles chart and earned him three Juno nominations.See Mike Ross, "Snow Alert," Jam, October 14, 2000. Available Online at: http://jam.canoe.ca/Music/Artists/S/Snow/2000/10/14/749728.html. Accessed September 14, 2010.

In 2002, Snow worked with Shaggy and Blu Cantrell's producer to record Two Hands Clapping. "Legal", the first single, reached number 13 on the Canadian Singles Chart.

 2013–present 
In 2013, after Yahoo CEO Marissa Mayer complained about the company's "hold" music during a fourth-quarter earnings call, Snow and the Jingle Punks recorded a much publicized jingle for Yahoo.  The lyrics went, "You're on hold / Hold on at Yahoo / Gimme a second while I patch you through," goes the first verse. "The CEO didn't like the hold music / So Daddy Snow wrote this jam for you."

In summer 2014 while in Miami, Florida, Snow signed with Bugatti Music Entertainment and teamed up with Grammy-winning producers Cool & Dre, Kent Jones and Scott Storch and began recording again.<ref>Morgan, Simone (2014) "Looks like it’s gonna Snow", Jamaica Observer, October 12, 2014. Retrieved October 14, 2014</</ref>

On October 2, 2014, Snow's new single "Shame" was released, featuring Mykal Rose (Black Uhuru). On October 11, 2014, Snow announced that all proceeds from "Shame" will be donated to the fight against cancer.

On June 19, 2017, Snow was awarded the Socan Classics 100,000 Radio Performances in Canada for commemorating more than 100k times his music has played on radio. 

On January 23, 2019, Puerto Rican rapper Daddy Yankee released the reggaeton and dancehall song "Con Calma" featuring Snow, which has been described as a remake or reimagination of "Informer". The single peaked at number 22 on the Billboard Hot 100, becoming Snow's first entry on the chart since 1993, and reached number one on the US Hot Latin Songs list. Internationally, the track topped the charts of five Spanish-language countries and reached the top 10 in 10 others in Latin America. Across Europe, the song entered the charts of numerous countries, peaking at number 14 in Italy and number 23 in Switzerland. In the Netherlands, the song rose to number one in April 2019. "Con Calma" also became Snow's first entry on the Canadian Hot 100 chart after debuting at number 99 in February 2019. It eventually peaked at number 6.   

On October 17, 2019, Snow and his wife Tara O'Brien attended the 5th Annual Latin American Music Awards in Hollywood, California at the Dolby Theatre. Snow was nominated for three awards.

In February 2020, Snow won four awards Song of the Year with Daddy Yankee for "Con Calma" at Premio Lo Nuestro Awards.  

In March 2020, Snow was given the Pop Music Award from SOCAN.

Snow and Daddy Yankee won the Top Latin Song of the Year at the 2020 Billboard Music Awards, and "Con Calma" won big at the Latin Billboard Music Awards on October 21, 2020, with Snow taking home six awards. Snow attended the awards with Tara O'Brien in Florida.

 Television and film appearances
Drew Carey, a long time Snow fan, had Snow record a reggae version of The Drew Carey Show theme song, "Moon Over Parma", for the series' eighth and ninth seasons.

In 2001, Snow played a prison guard in the film Prison Song. Snow appears as himself in the 2012 film The Movie Out Here produced by Canadian brewing company Kokanee and Alliance Films.

In 2015, Snow and his then-fiancée, Tara Elizabeth, appeared on a CBC webseries called True Dating Stories to tell the story of one of their first dates: A walk in a ravine turned police operation.
Their episode was the most watched and the entire series won Best Web Series at the Hollywood Comedy Shorts Film Festival.

 Ethnicity and Canadian identity
In Ethnicity, Politics, and Public Policy: Case Studies in Canadian Diversity, Rebecca J. Haines examined Snow as a symbol of Canadian ethnic identity. Instead of hiding his "whiteness" and "Canadian-ness," Haines argues, Snow proudly boasts of his Irish heritage and pride in his family, the O'Briens, and traces his reggae roots to the diverse community of Allenbury. While other artists, such as Snoop Dogg, don a Toronto Maple Leafs jersey because of its resemblance to cannabis, "in the video for his single "Anything for You", shot on location in Jamaica, the white Canadian reggae artist Snow is seen wearing the same jersey, perhaps in an attempt to proclaim his Canadian roots among the all-black cast of this video."

Many reggae purists viewed Snow, along with Ini Kamoze, Diana King, UB40, Shaggy and Shabba Ranks, as another example of "watered down" commercial reggae that rose to international popularity in the 1990s. The sketch comedy show In Living Color, parodied "Informer" by featuring fellow Canadian Jim Carrey as Snow in a sketch titled "Imposter".

In 1996, WBLS New York disc jockey Pat McKay observed, "purists have a problem with a non-Jamaican doing reggae. But I choose to think of it as the greatest compliment to reggae culture, and Snow is a genuine, dedicated artist. He has a fine singing voice, he's a great writer, and he very generously includes other artists in all of his work. His authenticity amplifies the realities of his generation, and his sensitivity conjures up intimacy with all of his love songs."

Personal life
In November 2009, Snow's then-common law wife and the subject of many of his songs, Tamei Edberg, was diagnosed with cancer; she died three weeks later on November 27, 2009, at the age of 41. With Tamei, Snow has a daughter, Justuss born in April of 1996 and of whom he was inspired to name his third album after respectively. In 2018 Snow became a grandfather, as Justuss gave birth to a son, Lyrix Tre. Justuss was featured on the song "J Dot" when she was six years old on his sixth and most recent full-length album to date, Two Hands Clapping (2002). He also has another daughter from another relationship, who was born in January of the same year (making his two daughters just three months apart). On June 24, 2010, Snow held a fundraiser called "ClosURE For Cancer" at Alley Catz Restaurant in Toronto during which they raised $15,000. Snow also started his own non-governmental organization called "Pure Snow NGO," which assists "tenants living in non-profit housing".

In May 2016, Snow married model/actress Tara Elizabeth Singh at St. Anselm Catholic Church in Toronto. CTV covered the ceremony and local radio station KISS 92.5 interviewed the newlyweds on The Roz and Mocha Show on May 22, 2016.

DiscographyStudio albumsCompilation albums The Greatest Hits of Snow (1997)Remix albums Best Remix of Snow (1998)SinglesAwards and nominationsLatin Billboard Music Awards!Ref.
|-
| rowspan=8|2020
| rowspan=8|"Con Calma"
| Latin Rhythm Song of The Year
| 
|
|-
| Streaming Song of The Year
| 
|
|-
| Airplay Song of The Year
| 
|
|-
| Hot Latin Song of The Year
| 
|
|-
| Hot Latin Song Vocal Event of The Year
| 
|
|-
| Digital Song of The Year
| 
|
|-
| Crossover Artist of The Year
| 
|
|-
| Top Latin Song of The Year
| 
|Billboard Music Awards!Ref.
|-
| rowspan=3|1993
| Snow
| Top Hot 100 Artist - Male
| 
| rowspan=3|
|-
| "Informer"
| Top Rap Song
| 
|-
| 12 Inches of Snow
| Top Reggae Album
| 
|-
|2020
| Con Calma - Daddy Yankee & Snow
| Top Latin Song of The Year 
| 
|Juno Awards|-
| align="center"| 1994
| "Informer"
| Best Reggae Recording	
| 
|-
| align="center"| 1994
| Snow
| Best Male Vocalist 
| 
|-
| align="center"| 1994
| 12 Inches of Snow
| Best Album 
| 
|-
| align="center"| 1996
| "Si Wi Dem Nuh Know We"
| Best Reggae Recording 
| 
|-
| align="center"| 1998
| "Justuss"
| Best Reggae Recording 
| 
|-
| align="center"| 2001
| Snow
| Best Male Artist 
| 
|-
| align="center"| 2001
| Snow/Patterson
| Best Song Writer 
| 
|-
| align="center"| 2001
| Mind on the Moon
| Best Pop Album 
| 
|-
| align="center"| 2002
| "The Plumb Song"
| Best Video 
| 
|-
| align="center"| 2003
| "Two Hands Clapping"
| Best Reggae Recording 
| Latin Grammy Awards|-
| align="center"| 2019
| "Con Calma"
| Best Urban Fusion/Performance
| 
|-
|}Lo Nuestro Awards|-
| align="center" rowspan="5"| 2020 
| rowspan="5"|"Con Calma"
| Song of the Year
| 
|-
| Single of the Year
| 
|-
| Crossover Collaboration of the Year
| 
|-
| Urban Song of the Year
| 
|-
| Urban Collaboration of the Year
| 
|}Recording Industry Association of Japan|-
| align="center"| 1994
| Snow
| Best New Recording Artist	
|Society of Composers, Authors, and Music Publishers of Canada Video Award'''

|-
| align="center"| 2020
| "Con Calma Remix"
|Socan Pop Music Award
| 

|-
| align="center"| 2001
| "Everybody Wants to Be Like You"
| Much Music Top Video
|

References

External links

1969 births
Living people
Canadian hip hop singers
Canadian male singers
Canadian people of Irish descent
Canadian reggae musicians
Juno Award for Reggae Recording of the Year winners
People from North York
Reggae fusion artists
Rappers from Toronto